Iridana perdita is a butterfly in the family Lycaenidae. It is found in Cameroon and possibly Uganda.

References

Endemic fauna of Cameroon
Butterflies described in 1890
Poritiinae
Butterflies of Africa